Rawdon Billing, sometimes referred to as Billing Hill, is a tree-topped hill situated in Rawdon, West Yorkshire, England.

The remains of a quarry, as well as concrete foundations for World War II defensive installations, can be found near the top. A number of local footpaths (81, 89, 90 and 91) cross the Billing or near to it, and it is possible to see many landmarks on a clear day, including York Minster, with a very good view of aircraft entering and leaving Leeds Bradford International Airport.

It is owned by the Rawdon Trust, land agents for the Emmott family from Lancashire. The Billing is a popular place for local walkers and plane spotters as it overlooks Leeds Bradford Airport.

In 1778, a gold torc was found on the Billing. The whereabouts of the artifact is unknown.

Though sparse, there is evidence of coal on the Billing; however, though it was used previously as a quarry, there is no sign of mining.

Stone from the Billing was apparently used at the base of 48 Albion Street in Leeds city centre. The former bank now houses a Starbucks.

References

External links
 Route map leaflet which includes a walk over Rawdon Billing (Leeds City Council "Doorstep Walks")

Hills of West Yorkshire